The 1961–62 Landsdelsserien was a Norwegian second-tier football league season, the last named Landsdelsserien.

The league was contested by 55 teams, divided into a total of seven groups from four districts; Østland/Søndre, Østland/Nordre, Sørland/Vestre and Møre/Trøndelag. The seven group winners qualified for promotion play-offs to compete for two spots in the 1963 1. divisjon. Sarpsborg and Gjøvik-Lyn won the play-offs and were promoted to the top flight. Due to a format change in the league system, 45 teams were relegated to the 1963 3. divisjon.

Tables

District Østland/Søndre

District Østland/Nordre

District Sørland/Vestland

Group A

Group B

Group C

District Møre/Trøndelag

Møre

Trøndelag

Promotion play-offs

First round
Sørland/Vestland 
Results
Haugar 2–0 Start
Start 2–4 Os
Os Os 3–2 Haugar

Møre/Trøndelag
Kvik 0–0 Aalesund
Aalesund 2–0 Kvik

Aalesund won 2–0 on aggregate and qualified for the final round.

Final round
Results

Sarpsborg 2–0 Os
Os 0–3 Sarpsborg

Sarpsborg won 5–0 on aggregate and were promoted to the 1. divisjon.

Gjøvik-Lyn 1–1 Aalesund
Aalesund 1–2 Gjøvik-Lyn

Gjøvik-Lyn won 3–2 on aggregate and were promoted to the 1. divisjon.

Relegation play-offs
Raufoss 4–0 Sparta
Sparta 2–2 Raufoss

Raufoss won 6–2 on aggregate and remained in 2. divisjon. Sparta were relegated to the 3. divisjon.

References

Norwegian First Division seasons
1961 in Norwegian football
1962 in Norwegian football
Norway